Unsteady flows are characterized as flows in which the properties of the fluid are time dependent. It gets reflected in the governing equations as the time derivative of the properties are absent.
For Studying Finite-volume method for unsteady flow there is some governing equations
>

Governing Equation
The conservation equation for the transport of a scalar in unsteady flow has the general form as 

 is Net rate of flow of   out of fluid element(convection), 
 is Rate of increase of  due to diffusion, 
 is Rate of increase of  due to sources.

The first term of the equation reflects the unsteadiness of the flow and is absent in case of steady flows. The finite volume integration of the governing equation is carried out over a control volume and also over a finite time step ∆t.

The control volume integration of the steady part of the equation is similar to the steady state governing equation's integration. We need to focus on the integration of the unsteady component of the equation. To get a feel of the integration technique, we refer to the one-dimensional unsteady heat conduction equation.

Now, holding the assumption of the temperature at the node being prevalent in the entire control volume, the left side of the equation can be written as 

By using a first order backward differencing scheme, we can write the right hand side of the equation as

Now to evaluate the right hand side of the equation we use a weighting parameter  between 0 and 1, and we write the integration of 

Different Schemes 
1. We substitute  to get the explicit discretisation i.e.:

where . One thing worth noting is that the right side contains values at the old time step and hence the left side can be calculated by forward matching in time. The scheme is based on backward differencing and its Taylor series truncation error is first order with respect to time. All coefficients need to be positive. For constant k and uniform grid spacing,  this condition may be written as

This inequality sets a stringent condition on the maximum time step that can be used and represents a serious limitation on the scheme. It becomes very expensive to improve the spatial accuracy because the maximum possible time step needs to be reduced as the square of  

2. Crank-Nicolson scheme : the Crank-Nicolson method results from setting . The discretised unsteady heat conduction equation becomes

Where 

Since  more  than  one  unknown  value  of  T  at  the  new  time  level  is  present  in  equation the  method  is  implicit  and  simultaneous  equations  for  all  node  points  need  to  be  solved  at each time step. Although  schemes  with  including  the  Crank-Nicolson  scheme, are unconditionally  stable  for  all  values  of  the  time  step it  is  more  important  to ensure that all coefficients are positive for physically realistic and bounded results. This is the case if the coefficient of  satisfies the following condition

which leads to

the Crank-Nicolson is based on central differencing and hence is second order accurate in time. The  overall accuracy  of a computation  depends  also on the  spatial differencing  practice, so the  Crank-Nicolson  scheme  is  normally  used  in  conjunction  with  spatial  central differencing

3. Fully implicit Scheme when the value of Ѳ is set to 1 we get the fully implicit scheme. The discretised equation is:

Both  sides  of  the  equation  contain  temperatures  at  the  new  time  step, and  a  system  of  algebraic equations must be solved at each time level. The  time  marching  procedure starts  with  a  given  initial  field  of  temperatures  . The system of equations is solved after selecting time step . It  can  be  seen  that  all  coefficients  are  positive, which  makes  the  implicit  scheme  unconditionally stable  for  any  size  of  time  step. Since  the  accuracy  of  the  scheme  is  only  first-order  in  time, small time steps are needed to ensure the accuracy of results. The  implicit  method  is  recommended  for  general  purpose  transient  calculations  because  of  its robustness and unconditional stability

References

Computational fluid dynamics